This is a list of speakers of the North West Provincial Legislature in South Africa.

References

North West Province
North West Province
North West Province
North West Provincial Legislature
Speakers